Hasell is a surname and occasional given name. Notable people with the name include:

 Alfred Hasell (1872–1955), English cricketer
 Elizabeth Julia Hasell (1830–1887), English writer and literary reviewer
 Eva Hasell (1886–1974), British traveller and missionary in Canada
 James Hasell (fl. 1763–1771), British colonial official in North Carolina
 Neil Hasell (1918–1998), Australian rules footballer
 Samuel Hasell (1691–1751), Mayor of Philadelphia
 W. Hasell Wilson (1811–1902), American surveyor and civil engineer

Other uses
 D. Hasell Heyward House, Bluffton, South Carolina
 Hasell Point Site, Beaufort County, South Carolina

See also
 Haskell (surname)
 Hassell (surname)
 Haswell (surname)